Paralympic swimming at the 2017 ASEAN Para Games was held at the National Aquatic Centre, Kuala Lumpur from 18 to 22 September 2017.

Medal summary

Medalists

Men

Women

See also
Swimming at the 2017 Southeast Asian Games

External links
 Swimming Games results system

2017 ASEAN Para Games
Swimming at the ASEAN Para Games
ASEAN Para Games